Frank Walton (born July 9, 1994), better known by his stage name Fly Anakin is an American rapper and record producer from Richmond, Virginia. He is the co-founder of Richmond hip hop crew Mutant Academy.

Early life
Fly Anakin was raised in Richmond, Virginia. As a child he was a regular church goer. His older brother introduced him to rap albums including Ghostface Killah's Ironman, Jay Z's Reasonable Doubt and Hot Boys' Guerrilla Warfare. His later influences included Jeezy, Kendrick Lamar and Curren$y.

Career
Fly Anakin released his first mixtape in 2014, Mirrors_episode1, with future Mutant Academy member Ewonee. This was the first of over a dozen self-released mixtapes and EPs. Fly Anakin played in shows and in homes in Richmond.

He signed to Lex Records in 2019, releasing a collaborative album with Pink Siifu, FlySiifu's in November 2020, followed by an EP, $mokebreak in April 2021. In 2022, Fly Anakin released his debut solo studio LP Frank which included production from Madlib, Evidence and Mutant Academy members. According to Metacritic, the album received "universal acclaim" from critics, with a score of 84. Following its release, Frank also featured in several lists of the best albums of "2022 (so far)" including Complex, HipHopDX, Paste, The Quietus and Uproxx.

In March 2022, Fly Anakin performed several shows at SXSW Festival in Austin, Texas, including sets at the Lex showcase and the Song Exploder showcase. The following month he supported Armand Hammer on a short run of European shows at venues including XOYO, London and Le Botanique, Brussels and Le Bellevilloise, Paris.

A concert scheduled on the 5 May 2022 in Lyon, France was cancelled by the local concert promoter when Fly Anakin vetoed an opening act because the singer was not black. His booking agent wrote an e-mail stating: "All artists choose who they perform with because this is their art form, not yours. Nor is it your culture either, from what I understand. Fly Anakin wants to celebrate his culture, hop-hop, with Black artists..." The incident was reported in French media including the local Lyon newspaper Le Progrès, and national media including Marianne and BFM TV website.

Discography

Studio albums
 Open House with Henny L.O (2014)
 Chapel Drive with Koncept Jack$on (2017)
 People Like Us (2017)
 Panama Plus with Koncept Jack$on & TUAMIE (2017)
 Backyard Boogie with Ohbliv
 Emergency Raps, Vol. 4
 Holly Water with Big Kahuna OG
 At the End of the Day
 360 Santana
 FlySiifu's with Pink Siifu (2020)
 Frank (2022)

Extended plays
 $mokebreak with Pink Siifu (2021)

References

External links
 Official website
 

1994 births
Living people
American male rappers
21st-century American rappers
21st-century American male musicians